The Director-General is chief executive and editor-in-chief of public service broadcaster Raidió Teilifís Éireann (RTÉ). The current director-general is Dee Forbes, who replaced Noel Curran in the role in 2016.

Appointment and role
The RTÉ board appoints the director-general of RTÉ who in effect fulfils the dual role of chief executive and of editor in chief. The director-general heads the RTÉ Executive Board, which comprises the company's top management and includes the chief financial officer, the director of communications and the managing directors of the Television, Radio, and News divisions. The 
director-general reports to the board and sits on it "in an ex officio capacity".
The current director-general serves a term of five years (reduced from seven years) at which point he/she may ask for an extension.

Director Generals

References

External links
 History of Irish Public Service Broadcasting - Timeline